The 2017–18 South African Premier Division season (known as the ABSA Premiership for sponsorship reasons) is the 22nd season of the Premier Soccer League since its conception in 1996.

Bidvest Wits were the defending champions, having won the previous 2016–17 South African Premier Division (PSL) season. The season featured 15 teams from the 2016–17 season and one new team from the 2016–17 National First Division: AmaZulu replaced relegated Highlands Park. AmaZulu, although finishing only fifth in the National First Division (NFD) purchased winner's Thanda Royal Zulu's league status upon completion of the NFD season.

Teams

Stadiums and locations

Personnel and kits

League table

Standings

Statistics

Top scorers

References

External links
Premier Soccer League (PSL) Official Website
PSL Match Centre

South Africa
Premier Soccer League
Premier Soccer League seasons